In functional analysis and related areas of mathematics, a sequence space is a vector space whose elements are infinite sequences of real or complex numbers. Equivalently, it is a function space whose elements are functions from the natural numbers to the field K of real or complex numbers.  The set of all such functions is naturally  identified with the set of all possible infinite sequences with elements in K, and can be turned into a vector space under the operations of pointwise addition of functions and pointwise scalar multiplication. All sequence spaces are linear subspaces of this space.  Sequence spaces are typically equipped with a norm, or at least the structure of a topological vector space.

The most important sequence spaces in analysis are the  spaces, consisting of the -power summable sequences, with the p-norm.  These are special cases of Lp spaces for the counting measure on the set of natural numbers.  Other important classes of sequences like convergent sequences or null sequences form sequence spaces, respectively denoted c and c0, with the sup norm. Any sequence space can also be equipped with the topology of pointwise convergence, under which it becomes a special kind of Fréchet space called FK-space.

Definition 

Space of all sequences 

Let  denote the field either of real or complex numbers.

and componentwise scalar multiplication

A sequence space is any linear subspace of  

As a topological space,  is naturally endowed with the product topology. Under this topology,  is Fréchet, meaning that it is a complete, metrizable, locally convex topological vector space (TVS). Among Fréchet spaces,  is minimal in having no continuous norms: 

But the product topology is also unavoidable:  does not admit a strictly coarser Hausdorff, locally convex topology.  For that reason, the study of sequences begins by finding a strict linear subspace of interest, and endowing it with a topology different from the subspace topology.

spaces

For   is the subspace of  consisting of all sequences  satisfying

If  then the real-valued function  on  defined by

defines a norm on  In fact,  is a complete metric space with respect to this norm, and therefore is a Banach space.

The canonical norm induced by this inner product is the usual -norm, meaning that  for all  

If  then  is defined to be the space of all bounded sequences endowed with the norm

 is also a Banach space.

If  then  does not carry a norm, but rather a metric defined by

c, c0 and  c00

A  is any sequence  such that  exists. 

The ,  is the subspace of  consisting of all sequences which have only finitely many nonzero elements. This is not a closed subspace and therefore is not a Banach space with respect to the infinity norm. For example, the sequence  where  for the first  entries (for ) and is zero everywhere else (that is) is a Cauchy sequence but it does not converge to a sequence in

Space of all finite sequences 

Let 
,

For every natural number  let  denote the usual Euclidean space endowed with the Euclidean topology and let  denote the canonical inclusion 
.  
The image of each inclusion is

and consequently,
 

This family of inclusions gives  a final topology , defined to be the finest topology on  such that all the inclusions are continuous (an example of a coherent topology). With this topology,  becomes a complete, Hausdorff, locally convex, sequential, topological vector space that is  Fréchet–Urysohn.

With this identification,  is the direct limit of the directed system  where every inclusion adds trailing zeros: 
.   
This shows  is an LB-space.

Other sequence spaces 
The space of bounded series, denote by bs, is the space of sequences  for which

This space, when equipped with the norm

is a Banach space isometrically isomorphic to  via the linear mapping

The subspace cs consisting of all convergent series is a subspace that goes over to the space c under this isomorphism.

This set is dense in many sequence spaces.

Properties of ℓp spaces and the space c0 

The space ℓ2 is the only ℓp space that is a Hilbert space, since any norm that is induced by an inner product should satisfy the parallelogram law

Substituting two distinct unit vectors for x and y directly shows that the identity is not true unless p = 2.

Each  is distinct, in that  is a strict subset of  whenever p < s; furthermore,  is not linearly isomorphic to  when .

If 1 < p < ∞, then the (continuous) dual space of ℓp is isometrically isomorphic to ℓq, where q is the Hölder conjugate of p: 1/p + 1/q = 1.  The specific isomorphism associates to an element x of  the functional

so that the operator norm satisfies

gives Lx(y) = ||x||q, so that in fact

Thus the mapping  gives an isometry

The map

obtained by composing κp with the inverse of its transpose coincides with the canonical injection of ℓq into its double dual.  As a consequence ℓq is a reflexive space. By abuse of notation, it is typical to identify ℓq with the dual of ℓp: (ℓp)* = ℓq.  Then reflexivity is understood by the sequence of identifications (ℓp)** = (ℓq)* = ℓp.

The space c0 is defined as the space of all sequences converging to zero, with norm identical to  ||x||∞. It is a closed subspace of ℓ∞, hence a Banach space. The dual of c0 is ℓ1; the dual of ℓ1 is ℓ∞. For the case of natural numbers index set, the ℓp and c0 are separable, with the sole exception of ℓ∞.  The dual of ℓ∞ is the ba space.

The spaces c0 and ℓp (for 1 ≤ p < ∞) have a canonical unconditional Schauder basis {ei | i = 1, 2,...}, where ei is the sequence which is zero but for a 1 in the i th entry.

The space ℓ1 has the Schur property: In ℓ1, any sequence that is weakly convergent is also strongly convergent .  However, since the weak topology on infinite-dimensional spaces is strictly weaker than the strong topology, there are nets in ℓ1 that are weak convergent but not strong convergent.

The ℓp spaces can be embedded into many Banach spaces. The question of whether every infinite-dimensional Banach space contains an isomorph of some ℓp or of c0, was answered negatively by B. S. Tsirelson's construction of Tsirelson space in 1974. In general, ker Q is not complemented in ℓ1, that is, there does not exist a subspace Y of ℓ1 such that . In fact, ℓ1 has uncountably many uncomplemented subspaces that are not isomorphic to one another (for example, take ; since there are uncountably many such Xs, and since no ℓp is isomorphic to any other, there are thus uncountably many ker Qs).

Except for the trivial finite-dimensional case, an unusual feature of ℓp is that it is not polynomially reflexive.

ℓp spaces are increasing in p 
But if , then  for all , and then .

ℓ2 is isomorphic to all separable, infinite dimensional Hilbert spaces 
Let H be a separable Hilbert space.  Every orthogonal set in H is at most countable (i.e. has finite dimension or ).  The following two items are related:
 If H is infinite dimensional, then it is isomorphic to ℓ2
 If , then H is isomorphic to

Properties of ℓ1 spaces 
A sequence of elements in ℓ1 converges in the space of complex sequences ℓ1 if and only if it converges weakly in this space. 
If K is a subset of this space, then the following are equivalent:
 K is compact;
 K is weakly compact;
 K is bounded, closed, and equismall at infinity.
Here K being equismall at infinity means that for every , there exists a natural number  such that  for all .

See also 

Lp space
Tsirelson space
beta-dual space
Orlicz sequence space
Hilbert space

References

Bibliography
 .
 .
  
 .
  
  
 .
  

 
Functional analysis
Sequences and series